KJAS may refer to:

 KJAS (FM), a radio station (107.3 FM) licensed to Jasper, Texas, United States
 KJAS-LP, a low-power radio station (102.1 FM) licensed to Ames, Iowa, United States
 KKHT-FM, a radio station (100.7 FM) licensed to Winnie, Texas, United States, which held the call sign KJAS from January 1987 to August 1996
 KJXX, a radio station (1170 AM) licensed to Jackson, Missouri, United States, which held the call sign KJAS until June 1986
 Jasper County Airport (Texas) (ICAO airport code KJAS)